The 1935 Limerick Senior Hurling Championship was the 41st staging of the Limerick Senior Hurling Championship since its establishment by the Limerick County Board.

Ahane were the defending champions.

Ahane won the championship after a 6-08 to 2-03 defeat of Kildimo in the final. It was their fourth championship title overall and their third title in succession.

Results

Final

References

Limerick Senior Hurling Championship
Limerick Senior Hurling Championship